Arthur Marshall may refer to:

Sportspeople

 Arthur Marshall (rugby union) (1855–1909), Scotland international rugby union player
 Arthur Marshall (footballer) (1881–?), English footballer
 Arthur Marshall (American football) (born 1969), former American football wide receiver

Politicians

 Arthur Marshall (Australian politician) (1934–2018), Australian former politician and tennis player
 Arthur Marshall (British politician) (1870–1956), English Liberal Party politician
 Arthur Wellington Marshall (1841–1918), mayor of Huntingdon

Writers

 Arthur Marshall (broadcaster) (1910–1989), British writer and broadcaster
 Arthur Hammond Marshall (1866–1934), English novelist who wrote under the pseudonym Archibald Marshall
 Arthur Calder-Marshall (1908–1992), British novelist, essayist, memoirist and biographer

Scientists

 Arthur R. Marshall (1919–1985), scientist, ecologist and Everglades conservationist
 Arthur Milnes Marshall (1852–1893), English zoologist

Others

 Arthur George Marshall (1858–1915), British architect and photographer
 Arthur Marshall (engineer) (1903–2007), British aviation pioneer and businessman
 Arthur Marshall (composer) (1881–1968), African-American composer and performer of ragtime music
 Arthur Featherstone Marshall (1818–1877), English Anglican priest who converted to Roman Catholicism
 Arthur H. Marshall, American hiker/climber, the first person to reach every US state highpoint.